Artyom Olegovich Shchadin (born 1 November 1992) is a Russian professional football player.

External links
 
 
 

1992 births
Footballers from Yaroslavl
Living people
Russian footballers
Association football midfielders
Russian expatriate footballers
Expatriate footballers in Belarus
FC Shinnik Yaroslavl players
FC Armavir players
FC Kuban Krasnodar players
FC Rostov players
FC Torpedo-BelAZ Zhodino players
FC Nizhny Novgorod (2015) players
Russian Premier League players
Belarusian Premier League players